Reginald Rose (December 10, 1920 – April 19, 2002) was an American screenwriter. He wrote about controversial social and political issues. His realistic approach was particularly influential in the anthology programs of the 1950s.

Rose was born and raised in Manhattan. He was best known for his courtroom drama Twelve Angry Men, exploring the members of a jury in a murder trial. It was adapted for a film of the same name, directed by Sidney Lumet and released in 1957.

Early years
Reginald Rose was born in Manhattan on December 10, 1920, the son of Alice (née Obendorfer) and William Rose, a lawyer. Rose attended Townsend Harris High School and briefly attended City College (now part of the City University of New York). He served in the U.S. Army during World War II, from 1942–46, where he was promoted to first lieutenant.

Rose began trying to write when he was 15 years old and living in Harlem, but he said, "I didn't make it until I was 30." In the interim, he worked as an ad agency's copywriter, a publicist for Warner Bros, a window washer, a clerk, and a counselor at a camp.

Television
He sold Bus to Nowhere, his first teleplay, in 1951 to the live dramatic anthology program Studio One. They bought his play, Twelve Angry Men, four years later. This latter drama, set entirely in a room where a jury is deliberating the fate of a teenage boy accused of murder, was inspired by Rose's service on a similar trial. The play later was adapted as the 1957 film of the same name, directed by Sidney Lumet.

Rose said about his own jury service: "It was such an impressive, solemn setting in a great big wood-paneled courtroom, with a silver-haired judge, it knocked me out. I was overwhelmed. I was on a jury for a manslaughter case, and we got into this terrific, furious, eight-hour argument in the jury room. I was writing one-hour dramas for Studio One then, and I thought, wow, what a setting for a drama." 

Rose received an Emmy for his teleplay Twelve Angry Men and an Oscar nomination for its 1957 feature-length film adaptation. From 1950 to 1960, Rose wrote for all three of the major broadcast networks. In 1961 he created and wrote for The Defenders. The weekly courtroom drama was spun off from one of Rose's episodes of Studio One. The Defenders won two Emmy awards for his dramatic writing.

Rose co-wrote the 1986 TV movie My Two Loves, starring Mariette Hartley and Lynn Redgrave.

Twilight Zone
His teleplay The Incredible World of Horace Ford was the basis for a 1963 episode of the television series The Twilight Zone. It starred Pat Hingle, Nan Martin, and Ruth White. The episode was broadcast on CBS on April 18, 1963, as Episode 15 of Season Four. The theme was how individuals glorify the past by repressing and exercising censorship of the negative aspects: we remember the good while we forget the bad. The teleplay had originally been produced in 1955 as a Studio One episode.

Films
Rose wrote screenplays for many dramas, beginning with Crime in the Streets (1956), an adaptation of his 1955 teleplay for The Elgin Hour. He made four movies with British producer Euan Lloyd: The Wild Geese, The Sea Wolves, Who Dares Wins and Wild Geese II.

Personal life and death 
Rose married Barbara Langbart in 1943, with whom he had four children.  After they divorced, he married Ellen McLaughlin (not the playwright and actress) in 1963, with whom he had two children.

Rose died on April 19, 2002, in a Norwalk, Connecticut, hospital, aged 81. The cause of death was complications of heart failure.

Papers
Rose's papers are housed in the Wisconsin Historical Society Archives at the Wisconsin Center for Film and Theater Research. The collection includes "variant drafts of scripts, correspondence, clippings, and production information". Films and tape recordings are included in addition to printed documents. Columbia University Libraries also have scripts, "cast lists, shooting schedules, and allied notes and papers" related to The Defenders. The material is housed in the Rare Book and Manuscript Library.

Plays
The Porcelain Year (1950)
Twelve Angry Men (1954)
Sacco-Vanzetti Story (1960)
Black Monday (1962)
Dear Friends (1968)
This Agony, This Triumph (1972)

References

External links
Reginald Rose  at the Museum of Broadcast Communications
Reginald Rose Papers  at the Wisconsin Center for Film and Theater Research

American male screenwriters
1920 births
2002 deaths
20th-century American male writers
20th-century American screenwriters
Screenwriters from New York (state)
20th-century American dramatists and playwrights
American male dramatists and playwrights